Na'omi is an Israeli settlement organized as a moshav shitufi in the West Bank. Located in the Jordan Valley three kilometres north of Hisham's Palace, it falls under the jurisdiction of Bik'at HaYarden Regional Council.

The international community considers Israeli settlements in the West Bank illegal under international law, but the Israeli government disputes this.

History
According to ARIJ, in 1979 Israel confiscated 5,048 dunams of land from the Palestinian village of An-Nuway'imah in order to construct Na'omi.

Na'omi was established in 1982, and was initially named Na'ama due to its proximity to the Palestinian village of an-Nuway'imah, before being renamed after the biblical figure of Naomi.

References

Moshavim
Israeli settlements in the West Bank
Populated places established in 1982
1982 establishments in the Palestinian territories